Alfred Clarence Pete Nelson was born in Salt Lake City, Utah on November 14, 1898. At the age of two, his family moved to Denver, Colorado. 
Nelson graduated from Denver's South High School in 1916. He received the nickname Pete while playing football in high school after a University 
of Colorado football player whose name was Pete Nelson. At the University of Denver Nelson earned both his bachelor's and master's degrees. After two 
years of graduate study at the University of Illinois, he returned to the University of Denver as an associate professor of chemistry. In 1926, Nelson 
earned his Doctorate of Philosophy from the University of Illinois. Throughout his career at the University of Denver, Nelson held many positions. He began his career as an assistant  professor in 1923 and served as interim chancellor in 1948. He was well liked by the students and faculty. A writer for the Denver Post dubbed him  The Affable 'Mr. Chips' of Denver University in a profile. He received numerous awards throughout his career at the university, including the Kappa Delta Pi fraternity Honor Award for Service in Education (1963), University of Denver College of Engineering Distinguished Faculty Award (1963) and the Evans Award from the University of Denver Alumni Association (1971). The University of Denver awarded the honorary LLD degree to him in 1964. In addition  to the various boards he served on in the community, Nelson was a member of many educational associations. The organizations include American Institute of Chemists, Fellow; American Association for the Advancement of Science, Fellow; American Chemical Society; Colorado Schoolmasters Club; Phi Beta Kappa; Phi Delta Kappa; Kappa Delta Pi; Alpha Chi Sigma and Phi Lambda Upsilon. Nelson was a member of the first pledge class of the Alpha Pi chapter of Lambda Chi Alpha.

He died in 1980 at the age of 81.

References

1898 births
1980 deaths
Chancellors of the University of Denver
Scientists from Salt Lake City
University of Illinois alumni
University of Denver faculty
Fellows of the American Association for the Advancement of Science
20th-century American academics